Perrhenic acid is the chemical compound with the formula . Conventionally, perrhenic acid is considered to have the formula , and a species of this formula forms when rhenium(VII) oxide sublimes in the presence of water or steam. For most purposes, perrhenic acid and rhenium(VII) oxide are used interchangeably. Rhenium can be dissolved in nitric or concentrated sulfuric acid to produce perrhenic acid.

Properties
This species is a rare example of a metal oxide coordinated to water; most often metal–oxo–aquo species are unstable with respect to their corresponding hydroxides:

The two rhenium atoms have different bonding geometries, with one being tetrahedral and the other octahedral, and with the water ligands coordinated to the latter.

Gaseous perrhenic acid is tetrahedral, as suggested by its formula .

Reactions
Perrhenic acid or the related anhydrous oxide  converts to dirhenium heptasulfide upon treatment with hydrogen sulfide:

The heptasulfide, which has a complex structure, catalyses the hydrogenation of double bonds and is useful because it tolerates sulfur compounds, which poison noble metal catalysts.  also catalyses the reduction of nitric oxide to nitrous oxide.

Perrhenic acid in the presence of hydrochloric acid undergoes reduction in the presence of thioethers and tertiary phosphines to give rhenium(V) complexes with the formula .

Perrhenic acid combined with platinum on a support gives rise to a useful hydrogenation and hydrocracking catalyst for the petroleum industry. For example, silica impregnated with a solution of perrhenic acid is reduced with hydrogen at 500 °C. This catalyst is used in the dehydrogenation of alcohols and also promotes the decomposition of ammonia.

Catalysis
Perrhenic acid is a precursor to a variety of homogeneous catalysts, some of which are promising in niche applications that can justify the high cost of rhenium. In combination with tertiary arsines, perrhenic acid gives a catalyst for the epoxidation of alkenes with hydrogen peroxide. Perrhenic acid catalyses the dehydration of oximes to nitriles.

Other uses
Perrhenic acid is also used in the manufacture of x-ray targets.

See also
Perrhenate
Rhenium(VII) oxide

References

Mineral acids
Perrhenates
Transition metal oxoacids